Creatures the World Forgot is a 1971 adventure film directed by Don Chaffey and produced and written for Hammer Films by Michael Carreras. The film concentrates on the daily struggle to survive of a tribe of Stone Age men. Very little dialogue is spoken throughout the film, apart from a few grunts and gestures.

Plot synopsis
A volcano erupts and an earthquake opens up a crevasse, swallowing up many members of the 'Dark Tribe'. The tribal leader is killed and a fight for leadership between two survivors, Mak (Brian O'Shaughnessy) and Zen, soon breaks out. Mak is victorious and leads the surviving tribe members across a desert in search of a new home.  They meet and befriend a tribe of fair-haired people. The leader of the fair-haired people presents Mak with a girl, Noo, as a wife. Mak offers a girl in exchange, but she already has a mate. She tries to escape with her mate, but they are caught and killed. The Dark tribe move on and eventually settle in a fertile valley where they flourish. Noo gives birth to twin boys on the same day another woman gives birth to a mute girl. The tribe demand that the girl be sacrificed, but a lightning strike convinces the tribes' old witch to adopt her as her apprentice.

Years later, the now adolescent twins, (dark haired Rool and fair haired Toomak) fight for their father's attention. Rool tries to rape the mute girl. She escapes but falls into the grasp of a marauding tribe. Toomak leads Mak and the other tribesmen to the marauders' cave. A battle ensues and the marauders' chief is killed by Toomak. Toomak rescues the mute girl and takes the defeated chief's daughter, Nala, as his wife. Mak names Toomak as his successor as tribal chief and then dies of wounds sustained in the battle. Rool disputes the decision and he fights with Toomak in a ritualised battle. On the brink of victory, Toomak spares his brother's life. Toomak decides to leave, taking Nala and half the tribe with him. Consumed with hatred for his brother, Rool decides to track Toomak down. Rool and his men are attacked by a forest tribe, but are rescued by Toomak. Rool, still hating his brother, abducts Nala. Toomak chases after Rool. At the top of a cliff, Rool stakes Nala to a pyre. Toomak and Rool fight whilst Nala frees herself (only to be caught in the grasp of a python). Toomak saves Nala whilst the mute girl stabs an effigy of Rool, sending him falling to his death.

Production
All of the exterior sequences were shot in Namibia and South Africa. The film is the fourth and last of Hammer's "Cave Girl" sequence of films, directed by Don Chaffey and assistant director Simon Petersen, preceded by One Million Years B.C. (1966) (also directed by Don Chaffey), Prehistoric Women (1967) and When Dinosaurs Ruled the Earth (1970). Like the other films, it trades heavily on the audience appeal of scantily-clad tribeswomen. This film eschews the stop-motion animated dinosaurs of the first and third of the series.

Creatures the World Forgot is not related to two later, similarly titled films, The Land That Time Forgot (1975), and The People That Time Forgot (1977). These were made by Amicus Productions and both starred Doug McClure.

Cast
Julie Ege – Nala
Tony Bonner – Toomak
Brian O'Shaughnessy – Mak
Robert John – Rool
Sue Wilson – Noo
Rosalie Crutchley – The Old Crone
Marcia Fox – The Dumb Girl
Don Leonard – The Old Leader

References

External links
 
  
 

1971 films
British fantasy adventure films
Films set in prehistory
1970s English-language films
1970s fantasy adventure films
Films directed by Don Chaffey
Hammer Film Productions films
Films shot in Namibia
Films scored by Mario Nascimbene
1970s British films